Nelson's Ship in a Bottle is a monument created by British-Nigerian artist Yinka Shonibare. Commissioned in 2009 by the Greater London Authority, it was originally placed on the Fourth Plinth in London's Trafalgar Square in 2010.

It was subsequently relocated to a plinth outside the Sammy Ofer Wing of the National Maritime Museum in Greenwich, in southeast London, going on permanent display on 23 April 2012, two days before the museum's 75th anniversary. The work was purchased for £362,500 through a joint fund including a £50,000 contribution from the Art Fund and £264,300 from members of the public.

Description and production 
Made in 2010, the monument depicts Admiral Nelson’s ship  and measures 280 cm x 250 cm x 500 cm. The piece is intricate and features 80 cannons and 37 sails.

Cultural significance 

The monument represents "Africa's complicated relationship with colonial lifestyles and values." The sails are characteristic of West African clothing and are a tribute to the material which was taken by the Dutch during the colonial era. It is also thought to represent the diversity of London as a multicultural city, created by the European expansion. This reflects the history of the real vessel, which is thought to have had 22 nationalities represented, and illustrates the symbolism of England's diversity today. According to Shonibare:

"It's a celebration of London's immense ethnic wealth, giving expression to and honouring the many cultures and ethnicities that are still breathing precious wind into the sails of the United Kingdom."

A noticeable departure from the original ship is the African-patterned fabric used for the sails. This fabric is symbolic of the African identity and independence. This explores ties between colonialism and abolitionism, and the British relationship with indigenous peoples.

References

Trafalgar Square
Public art in London